Patrick Charles Doogan (1831 – 15 June 1906) was an Irish nationalist politician and a Member of Parliament (MP) for East Tyrone from 1895 to 1906.

He was elected as an Anti-Parnellite Nationalist MP for East Tyrone at the 1895 general election, and re-elected at the 1900 general election, this time for the Irish Parliamentary Party. He was again re-elected at the 1906 general election.

He died in office on 15 June 1906, the by-election for his seat was won by Tom Kettle.

External links

1831 births
1906 deaths
Members of the Parliament of the United Kingdom for County Tyrone constituencies (1801–1922)
UK MPs 1895–1900
UK MPs 1900–1906
UK MPs 1906–1910
People from County Tyrone
Irish Parliamentary Party MPs
Anti-Parnellite MPs